Tarung, (Dutch: Taroeng) is a populated area in Waikabubak, West Sumba, Indonesia. Tarung is home to the ritual of Wula Podhu, a several-week period of austere rites and rituals in November that ends with a day of offerings, song and dance.

References

Populated places in East Nusa Tenggara
Geography of Sumba